This article is about the particular significance of the century 901–1000 to Wales and its people.

Events

905 
The kingdom of Dyfed passes to Hywel Dda as a result of his marriage to Elen, the daughter of Llywarch ap Hyfaidd,  following the death of Llywarch's heir, Rhydderch.
920
Hywel Dda unites the kingdoms of Dyfed and Seisyllwg to create Deheubarth.
928
King Æthelstan of England receives the submission of Welsh kings, including Hywel Dda, and sets the border of Wales at the River Wye.
969
Iago ab Idwal imprisons his brother Ieuaf ap Idwal.
985
Cadwallon ab Ieuaf becomes King of Gwynedd.
986
Maredudd ab Owain becomes King of Gwynedd, after disposing of its previous ruler, Cadwallon ab Ieuaf.
987
Maredudd ab Owain becomes King of Deheubarth.
992
Maredudd ab Owain attacks Morgannwg.
999
Cynan ap Hywel becomes King of Gwynedd.
Vikings sack St David's and murder the bishop, Morgeneu.

Births
date unknown - Llywelyn ap Seisyll, King of Gwynedd and Deheubarth (d. 1023)

Deaths
900
Merfyn ap Rhodri, prince of Gwynedd
909
Cadell ap Rhodri, King of Seisyllwg
916
Anarawd ap Rhodri, King of Gwynedd
942
Idwal Foel, King of Gwynedd
950
Hywel Dda, King of most of Wales
953
 Haearnddur, son of Merfyn ap Rhodri (probable) 
979
Iago ab Idwal, King of Gwynedd
985
Hywel ab Ieuaf, King of Gwynedd
986
Cadwallon ab Ieuaf, King of Gwynedd
987
Owain ap Hywel, King of Deheubarth
999
Maredudd ab Owain, King of Gwynedd and Deheubarth
Morgeneu, Bishop of St David's (in Viking raid)

References

 
 
Wales